Hankin is a surname.
This surname can trace its roots back to either the Anglo-Saxon people of Britain and to the name Johan-kin, or to the Scandinavian Nordic name Haakon and its patronymic Haakonsson. The name "Haakon" is from Old Norse meaning "High kin" coming from Há (high/chosen) and konr (descendant/kin). Haakonsson subsequently became anglicised into Modern-English as Hankinson, Hankins, Hankin, Annakin. The surname is also a Jewish surname meaning child (kin) of Hanna.

Notable people with the surname include:

Ernest Hanbury Hankin (1865–1939), British bacteriologist, aeronautical theorist and naturalist
Larry Hankin (born 1940), American actor, performer, director and producer
Nigel Hankin (1920–2007), English lexicographer who lived in India
Ray Hankin (born 1956), former English footballer
Sean Hankin (born 1981), English semi-professional footballer
Simone Hankin (born 1973), Australian water polo player from the gold medal squad of the 2000 Summer Olympics
St. John Emile Clavering Hankin (1869–1909), British Edwardian essayist and playwright
Yehoshua Hankin (1864–1945), Zionist activist responsible for land purchases of the World Zionist Organization in Ottoman Palestine

See also
Hankin Range, small mountain range on Vancouver Island, British Columbia, Canada, located between Nimpkish and Bonanza Lakes
Hankins, a surname

Surnames from given names